Action in Slow Motion is a 1943 British silent short film.

In the very short film, which runs only 3 minutes, a completely nude woman is depicted frolicking in the surf. Then the film re-plays the same action in slow motion, from a different angle. It was an "art film" in the sense that this description was often used to dispute that the film was outright pornography. A card is displayed at the beginning that warns the viewer that the film is intended only for art students, and exhibition for other purposes could result in prosecution or jail time.

The only known print of this film was gifted to the British Film Institute, and is notable as an early depiction of full frontal female nudity in British cinema. The film has no production credits, so its author, and other information surrounding its production, are unknown.

References

External links
 

1943 short films
Black-and-white documentary films
British silent short films
British black-and-white films
1940s pornographic films
1943 films
Films set on beaches